Kamyzyaksky District is an administrative and municipal district (raion), one of the eleven in Astrakhan Oblast, Russia. It is located in the south of the oblast. Its administrative center is the town of Kamyzyak. As of the 2010 Census, the total population of the district was 48,647, with the population of Kamyzyak accounting for 33.5% of that number.

History
The district was established on July 14, 1925 when Astrakhan Governorate's administrative-territorial system was changed from uyezds and volosts to districts and rural communities. In May 1944, a part of the district's territory was transferred to Travinsky and Zelenginsky Districts. When Travinsky District was abolished in 1963, its territory was merged into Kamyzyaksky District.

References

Notes

Sources



Districts of Astrakhan Oblast
States and territories established in 1925